White Label Mix Series, Vol. 1 is a collaborative album by the American rapper Kool Keith and the singer Nancy Des Rose. It was released in 2004 by Gamelock Records and distributed by Liveone Records. It was entirely produced by Phantom Man.

Track listing

Personnel
 Keith Matthew Thornton – vocals
 Nancy Des Rose – vocals
 Phantom Man – producer
 XXX – executive producer
 Brian Hazard – mastering
 Darrick Angelone – project coordinator
 Tim Bontan – design and layout
 Jurjen – design and layout

References

Kool Keith albums
2004 remix albums